The International horticultural exposition 1993 (short: 1993 IGA ) was held at the Baden-Wuerttemberg state capital, Stuttgart, Germany. The IGA was within the past 54 years already the fifth major horticultural show which hosted Stuttgart in the 20th century. Recognised by the Bureau International des Expositions (BIE), the Expo ran from April 23, 1993, to October 17, 1993. Held at Wartenberg and Killesberg parks, the goal was to be visually and functionally integrated with the two challenging terrains, the Wartberg and the Leibfriedsche garden. This was achieved. The long Advised long-term goal to pull a U-shaped green belt around the city, which became a reality. The mascot of the horticultural show called "Flori", a bird with a cowboy hat. Overall, 7.3 million people visited the garden show. Thus the expectations of the city fathers were exceeded, because it had been expected a turnout of 7 million.

Application and preparation
The organization and management of horticultural event was in the hands of the established by the City and the Central Association of Horticulture IGA Stuttgart'93 GmbH. The chairman was the then-Mayor Manfred Rommel. As early as 1977 was the preparation of temporary and permanent installations, the Technical Department of the City of Stuttgart, headed by Mayor Hans-Dieter Künne, a postdoctoral civil responsibility. In the Parks Department project groups were formed to support sustainable approach.

Horticultural show areas

At Wartberg there was a landscape of extensive use, with virtually no public access. Hedges, ditches, dry stone walls and orchards dominated the terrain. No less challenging was the terrain of Leibfried's garden, which had a woodland park of trees.

Two main issues dominated the garden show at Wartberg, the preservation of an intact environment and the commitment to the concerns of people with disabilities. The land at Wartberg slopes were re-parceled. 40 permanent allotments resulting from this measure. To remain true to the premise of a responsible treatment of nature, the initiators came regarding the path width that only  were asphalted. The edges of one meter width were gravelled.

In Killesburg, the lake in the "Valley of Roses" was deepened and new sealed and equipped for the purpose of oxygen supply with a fountain permanently in operation. An open-air stage was created with 4,000 seats. The large flower meadow was lush (begonias, chrysanthemums, geraniums, marigolds, verbena, zinnia, impatiens, snapdragons and carnations planted).

At the Nations Gardens, 22 nations presented their products on an area of 52,000 square meters. The gardens were connected by wooden walkways. The various countries' typical plants were presented, such as apple ( Belgium , Switzerland , Netherlands ), olive (Iran , Sardinia and others), palm (Egypt , Angola , Tunisia , India), cherry ( China ) or grape (Austria, Hungary, Turkey and South Africa). A special garden was the Chinese "Qing Yin Garden", the "garden of beautiful melody". Using wood, brick and sandstone, it was created by the architects and gardeners of the "Middle Kingdom". It is a garden of bamboo and various conifers.

Bridges
Two bridges were built in tubular steel construction. Two other three-arm suspension bridges lead over the Stuttgart North station and the "Heilbronner Straße". The bridge Palaeontologic displays the motto: "Above landscape, below traffic". The planning and construction supervision was Schlaich, Berger and Partner, Stuttgart.

Brno Steg (1992, in use)
Footbridge Heilbronnerstraße (1992, in use) 
Lodz Steg (1992, in use)
Samara web (I) (1992, in use)
Samara web (II) (1992)

References

External links
 Official website of the BIE

International horticultural exhibitions
World's fairs in Germany
History of Stuttgart
1993 in Germany